Die Gute Fabrik is an independent game developer based in Copenhagen, Denmark. Founded in 2008 by artist Nils Deneken, and joined by game designers Douglas Wilson and Christoffer Holmgård, the studio is now led by writer Hannah Nicklin.

The company is best known for developing Where Is My Heart? and Johann Sebastian Joust, a game included in Sportsfriends, as well as Mutazione.

Games developed

References

External links 
 

Danish companies established in 2008
Indie video game developers
Video game companies based in Copenhagen
Video game companies established in 2008
Video game companies of Denmark